Barbara, Lady Mallowan,  (born Barbara Hastings Parker; 14 July 1908 – 21 November 1993) was an English archaeologist, Assyriologist, and epigraphist who specialised in cylinder seals.

Life and work 
Barbara Parker was born on 14 July 1908 to Reginald Francis Parker (1871–1946) and had a younger brother John Manwaring Parker (1911–1979). She worked in Baghdad and succeeded Robert Hamilton (1905–1995) as the secretary and librarian of the British School of Archaeology in Iraq from 1950 to 1961. She was its president from 1983 until her death in 1993.

Her first assignment from director Max Mallowan was to build a "dig house" at Nimrud, which she did and maintained for many years. She was typically the only staff member to reside in Baghdad throughout the school year, from October to June.

She was also a lecturer in Mesopotamian archaeology at the Institute of Archaeology, London, from 1961. She was not only involved in the excavations of Nimrud under Max Mallowan, but also at Tell al-Rimah and Tell Brak.

In the 1962 New Year Honours, she was appointed an Officer of the Order of the British Empire (OBE) in recognition of her service as secretary and librarian of the British School of Archaeology in Iraq.

Personal life 
Parker married Max Mallowan and became Lady Mallowan in 1977, following the death of his first wife Agatha Christie.

Selected works

References

1908 births
1993 deaths
English archaeologists
British women archaeologists
English Assyriologists
Epigraphers
Academics of the UCL Institute of Archaeology
Officers of the Order of the British Empire
Assyriologists
Wives of knights